Caught in the Act is the second live album released by Canadian jazz singer Michael Bublé on November 15, 2005. It was filmed and recorded at the Wiltern Theater in Los Angeles. The filmed concert was aired on PBS as an episode of Great Performances, and the show was subsequently released on DVD along with the audio CD to create the album package, although the audio disc only featured eight of the songs from the concert. In 2009, the video was also released in Blu-ray. The concert featured a few guest artists, including Laura Pausini and Chris Botti, as well as an unexpected comedic banter with Josh Groban.

Track listing

Personnel
 Vocals: Michael Bublé
 Musical direction, piano: Alan Chang
 Guitar: Randy Napoleon
 Drums: Robert Perkins
 Bass: Craig Polasko
 Tenor Saxophone: Mark Small
 Alto Saxophone: Robert Wilkerson
 Baritone Saxophone: Frank Basile
 Trombone: Josh Brown
 Trombone: Nick Vagenas
 Lead Trumpet: Jumaane Smith
 Trumpet: Bryan Lipps
 Trumpet: Justin Ray

Chart positions

Album

Certifications

References

Michael Bublé live albums
2005 live albums
143 Records live albums
Albums recorded at the Wiltern Theatre